The Old Bold Pilots Association is a group of pilots and enthusiasts who meet weekly to enjoy breakfast and discuss their enthusiasm for aviation. The organization is notable for the diverse background of its members that includes civilians and veterans of World War II, the Korean War, and the Vietnam War. Members have served in the United States military, the United Kingdom's Royal Air Force, Germany's Luftwaffe, and the Soviet Air Forces.

History
The Old Bold Pilots Association (OBPA) traces its beginnings to the mid-1980s, when four former United States Army Air Force P-47 Thunderbolt pilots met regularly for a meal and to share flying stories. The society formed with its current name and meeting location in 1995 at the suggestion of member Ray Toliver. The name of the group is a refutation of an observation made in 1949 by early airmail pilot, E. Hamilton Lee: "There are old pilots and bold pilots, but no old, bold pilots." The association is informal without a charter, dues, or speakers. Informality was desired by members who rejected the strict rules common in other aviation groups. One does not have to be a pilot to attend, and anyone with an interest in aviation is invited.

Activities

The OBPA holds a breakfast event every Wednesday at a Denny's restaurant in Oceanside, California. The breakfast starts at 8 am, although members start showing up as early as 6:30 am to get a head start on the festivities. The group occupies the back room of the restaurant, which is decorated with model aircraft hanging from the ceiling and photos of aircraft and pilots lining the walls. Attendees come from communities throughout southern California. Less frequent are visitors from around the world, including Germany, Australia, Hungary and South Africa. Some come for the camaraderie, while others find relief discussing the rigors of combat with people who have had similar experiences.

, membership has grown to over 300 people, although attendance at the weekly breakfast is typically 50–70 people. According to the group's web page, an annual Christmas party and periodic barbecues are also hosted. , the Old Bold Pilots Association continues to meet every week at Denny's restaurant, with attendance back to pre-pandemic levels.

Interviews for posterity

Heather Steele is a historian of warfare who over the course of several years interviewed a number of the OBPA members and captured their stories on her World War II History Project web site. Jonelle Cambis is a waitress who has served the OBPA at Dennys for over 20 years. Her father was in the Pacific with the U.S. Marines during World War II, and she credits the stories told by her customers with motivating her to document her father's activities.

In 2014, retired producer, Patrick Pranica, with friends George Dawe and Robert Broughton began interviewing OBPA members to record their stories for future generations. They started first with older OBPA members due to their advanced age, but planned to include all willing to participate. The initial interviews were intended to result in a documentary titled, Old Bold Pilots, that was hoped would interest cable channels into funding a television series. The pilot episode included an interview with Robert Broughton's brother, Jack Broughton, a famous fighter ace and aviation author. However, funding could not be secured. The team also tried a crowdfunded campaign that did not succeed and was eventually closed.

Other chapters
Chapters of the Old Bold Pilots have opened in Palm Desert, California, Seattle, Washington, and Washington, D.C. The Palm Desert group meets for breakfast at the Desert Willow Golf Resort on the last Thursday of each month and includes a presentation by a guest speaker. Past speakers have included aerial stuntman Troy Hartman, former Northrop Grumman Chief Executive Officer Kent Kresa, fighter ace Fritz Payne, aerospace engineer Burt Rutan, and aviation artist Stan Stokes. The Washington, D.C. group meets for lunch every Friday at the Army Navy Country Club in Arlington, Virginia.

Notable members
The following table contains an incomplete list of notable individuals who are or were members of the Old Bold Pilots Association. The table provides the member's name, branch of military service in which they served, OBP chapter to which they are affiliated, a brief description of their notability, and references to substantiate their membership and notability.

See also

 Aircraft Owners and Pilots Association
 International Order of Characters
 National Aeronautic Association
 Order of Daedalians
 Quiet Birdmen

Notes

External links

Aviation in California
Aviation organizations
Aviation organizations based in the United States
Clubs and societies in the United States
Organizations established in 1995
1995 establishments in California